This is a list of the 14 observers to the European Parliament for Slovakia in the 1999 to 2004 session. They were appointed by the Slovak Parliament as observers from 1 May 2003 until the accession of Slovakia to the EU on 1 May 2004.

List 

2003
Slovakia
Slovakia